Hamad Al-Montashari (Hamad al-Muntasharī) (born June 22, 1982) is a Saudi Arabian footballer for Al-Ittihad. Al-Montashari, a central defender, was declared the 2005 Asian Football Player of the Year, defeating Uzbekistan and FC Dynamo Kyiv striker Maksim Shatskikh
. With Al-Ittihad, Al-Montashari won the 2004 and 2005 AFC Champions Leagues. On June 1, 2007 in the 2006–07 Saudi Premier League final, Al-Montashari scored a last minute winning goal for Al-Ittihad that gave them their 7th league title. He is considered to be one of Ittihad's longest tenured players.

Honours

International
Saudi Arabia
Islamic Solidarity Games: 2005

References

External links

1982 births
Living people
Saudi Arabian footballers
Saudi Arabia international footballers
2004 AFC Asian Cup players
2006 FIFA World Cup players
2011 AFC Asian Cup players
Ittihad FC players
Asian Footballer of the Year winners
Sportspeople from Jeddah
Association football central defenders
Saudi Professional League players